Sieradowice Landscape Park (Sieradowicki Park Krajobrazowy) is a protected area (Landscape Park) in south-central Poland, covering an area of .

The Park lies within Świętokrzyskie Voivodeship: in Kielce County (Gmina Bodzentyn), Skarżysko County (Gmina Suchedniów) and Starachowice County (Gmina Pawłów, Gmina Wąchock).

Within the Landscape Park are three nature reserves.

Sieradowice
Parks in Świętokrzyskie Voivodeship